Mattia Mustacchio (born 17 May 1989) is an Italian footballer who plays for  club Cesena on loan from Pro Vercelli as a forward.

Club career
Mustacchio and Morris Donati were signed by Sampdoria on 31 January 2008 in co-ownership deal, for €700,000 and €300,000 respectively, as part of the deal that 50% registration of Andrea Caracciolo moved to opposite direction for €3.55 million. Mustacchio played his first Serie A match on 28 January 2009, a 3–1 victory against S.S. Lazio. He replaced Claudio Bellucci in the last minute. He played 5 Serie A matches, all as substitute. He also made his European debut on 26 February 2009, a 0–2 loss to FC Metalist Kharkiv; he came in for Marco Padalino in 82 minute. The match knocked Sampdoria out from the UEFA Cup.

In summer 2009 he left on loan to  A.C. Ancona. Sampdoria bought Mustacchio outright on 26 June 2010 from Brescia. Both clubs failed to form an agreement before the deadline, however Brescia did not submit a bid to Lega Calcio, thus Sampdoria got Donati and Mustacchio for free.

He left on loan to Varese in July 2010.

Vicenza
In January 2011 his loan was terminated and he left for Vicenza, re-joining Alessandro Bastrini. Mustacchio wore no.9 shirt left by Mattia Minesso. In summer 2011 Vicenza signed Mustacchio in a new co-ownership deal for a peppercorn of €500.

In June 2012, after Vicenza relegated, the club decided to give up most of the co-ownership deal, including Bastrini and Mustacchio; however, Sampdoria also gave to its remain 50% registration rights of Bastrini and Mustacchio to Vicenza for free. Vicenza was re-admitted to Serie B on 23 August 2012.

In 2012–13 Serie B Mustacchio changed to wear no.8 which left by Alemão (also briefly owned by Marco Cellini and Rodrigo Possebon). At the end of season Vicenza was relegated again.

Ascoli
On 11 July 2014 he was signed by Ascoli in a 2+1 year contract.

Pro Vercelli
Mustacchio was sold to Pro Vercelli on 31 August 2015.

Perugia
On 24 January 2017 Mustacchio was signed by Perugia.

On 31 January 2019 he joined Carpi on loan until the end of the 2018–19 season.

Crotone
On 24 July 2019, he signed a 2-year contract with Crotone.

Alessandria
On 15 January 2021, he joined Alessandria on a 2.5-year contract.

Return to Pro Vercelli
On 20 July 2022, Mustacchio returned to Pro Vercelli. On 17 January 2023, he was loaned to Cesena.

International career
Mustacchio was selected to 2009 Mediterranean Games and 2009 FIFA U-20 World Cup for Italy national under-20 football team.

On 12 August 2009 he made his debut with the Italy U-21 squad in a friendly match against Russia. On 7 September 2010 he scored his first goal, in a qualification match against Wales in Pescara.

References

External links
Profile at Football.it 
FIGC 

1989 births
Sportspeople from the Province of Brescia
Living people
Italian footballers
Brescia Calcio players
U.C. Sampdoria players
A.C. Ancona players
S.S.D. Varese Calcio players
L.R. Vicenza players
F.C. Pro Vercelli 1892 players
A.C. Perugia Calcio players
A.C. Carpi players
F.C. Crotone players
U.S. Alessandria Calcio 1912 players
Cesena F.C. players
Italy youth international footballers
Italy under-21 international footballers
Serie A players
Serie B players
Serie C players
Association football forwards
Mediterranean Games silver medalists for Italy
Mediterranean Games medalists in football
Competitors at the 2009 Mediterranean Games
Footballers from Lombardy